Omro High School is a public high school in Omro, Wisconsin.

Campus
In 2001 an addition to the high school was built.

Extracurricular activities
Student groups and activities include academic bowl, art club, audiovisual club, Badger Boys/Badger Girls, forensics, FBLA, FFA, history club, Key Club, math team, National Honor Society, O-Club (Varsity letter recipients), Students Against Destructive Decisions, ski club, Spanish club, and student council.

Athletics
The Omro Foxes compete in the Wisconsin Flyway Conference. They formerly belonged to the Eastern Valley Conference and before that the East Central Flyway Conference. Omro High School fields teams in soccer, baseball, basketball, cheerleading, cross country, dance, football, golf, powerlifting, softball, track & field, volleyball, and wrestling. An equestrian club/team began competition in fall 2008.

Every fall the Omro Foxes football team competes against the Winneconne Wolves for the China Bull Trophy, one of the oldest football rivalries in the state of Wisconsin.

While in the ECC, the boys' basketball team won 12 conference titles over a 15-year span. Their two state appearances also came during this 15-year span. In 2007, the Foxes track team won its first ECFC conference title and first WIAA sectional championship. In the fall of 2008, the Foxes boys' soccer team won the school's first Wisconsin Interscholastic Athletic Association (WIAA) regional championship. The soccer team broke its three-year regional title match losing streak by winning 1-0. In 2010 the powerlifting team captured its first state title. In the fall of 2010 the Foxes football team made its return to the state playoffs after a 12-year drought. The team lost in the second round of the playoffs.

State championships
 1997 Division 3 state basketball champions
 1999 Division 3 state basketball runner-up
 2007 Boys' Division 2 300m hurdle state champion (Patrick Plank)
 2008 Boys' Division 2 state 4x200m relay runner-up
 2009 Girls' Division 2 state 4x200m relay champions
 2009 Division 2 state powerlifting runner-up
 2010 Division 2 state powerlifting champions
 2010 Division C equestrian team reserve state champions

Notable alumni
Gordon R. Bradley, Wisconsin State Assembly
Andy Jorgensen (1986), Wisconsin State Assembly
Olin B. Lewis (1879), Minnesota politician

References

External links
Omro High School

Educational institutions established in the 1870s
Public high schools in Wisconsin
Schools in Winnebago County, Wisconsin